Rosalind or Rosalinde is  a girls' name derived from the Germanic hros, which meant horse, and lind which meant soft or tender. A folk etymology definition is pretty rose.

People
Rosalind Ashford (born 1943), American singer, member of Martha and the Vandellas
Rosalind Blauer (1943–1973), Canadian economist
Rosalind Brett, writer of romance novels
Rosalind Cash (1938–1995), American singer and actress
Rosalind Chao (born 1957), American actress born in Anaheim, California
Rosalind Creasy (born 1939), American landscape designer and author
Rosalind Franklin (1920–1958), British physical chemist and crystallographer who made very important contributions to the understanding of the fine structures of coal and graphite, DNA and viruses
Rosalind Hackett, American historian
Rosalind Halstead (born 1984), British actress
Rosalind Hamilton, Duchess of Abercorn (1869–1958), British aristocrat
Rosalind Heywood (1895–1980), British psychical researcher
Rosalind Hicks (1919–2005), British literary guardian and only child of Agatha Christie
Rosalind Hursthouse (born 1943), philosopher whose theories are centred to the abortion debate
Rosalind Knight (1933–2020), English actress
Rosalind Newman (born 1946), American choreographer
Rosalind Peychaud (born 1948), New Orleans civic activist
Rosalind Ridley (born 1949), British neuropsychologist
Rosalind Rowe (1933–2015), English table tennis player
Rosalind Russell (1907–1976), American actress

Astronomy
900 Rosalinde, asteroid
Rosalind (moon), moon of Uranus

Horses
Rosalind (harness horse), foaled 1933, 1936 Hambletonian winner

Literature
Rosalind (As You Like It), a fictional character in William Shakespeare's play As You Like It
Rosalind, the object of Colin Clout's love in Edmund Spenser's poem The Shepheardes Calender
"Rosalind", a poem by Alfred, Lord Tennyson
Rosalind, a play by J. M. Barrie

Places
Rosalind, Alberta, rural Canadian town
Rosalind Bank

Other
Rosalind (education platform), platform and web project for learning bioinformatics through problem solving
, a British R-class destroyer launched in 1916 and scrapped in 1926

See also
Rosalinda (disambiguation)

References